Acacia guinetii, commonly known as Guinet's wattle, is a shrub of the genus Acacia and the subgenus Pulchellae that is endemic to a small area along the coast of western Australia

Description
It blooms from June to September and produces yellow flowers. The rudimentary inflorescences are found on one or two headed racemes and have spherical flower-heads containing 50 to 75 densely packed golden flowers.

Taxonomy
The species was first formally described by the botanist Bruce Maslin in 1979 as a part of the work Studies in the genus Acacia (Mimosaceae) - Additional notes on the Series Pulchellae Benth. as published in the journal Nuytsia. It was reclassified by Leslie Pedley in 2003 as Racosperma guinetii and returned to genus Acacia in 2006.
It belongs to the Acacia pulchella group of wattles and resembles Acacia lasiocarpa.

Distribution
It is native to a small area on the coast in the Mid West regions of Western Australia where it is commonly situated on rocky hills growing in gravelly lateritic and rocky loam soils. It has a limited range from around Northampton in the north to Geraldton in the south where it is usually found as a part of heath communities.

Cultivation
The shrub is available commercially and can be planted as a part of a border, rockery or shrubbery and is noted its dense foliage, low spreading habit and the masses of yellow, fluffy spherical flowers it produces in winter and spring. It is quite fast growing, tolerates full sun and a light frost and drought but requires a well drained soil.

See also
 List of Acacia species

References

guinetii
Acacias of Western Australia
Taxa named by Bruce Maslin
Plants described in 1979